David Vernon Widder (25 March 1898 – 8 July 1990) was an American mathematician. He earned his Ph.D. at Harvard University in 1924 under George Birkhoff and went on to join the faculty there.

He was a co-founder of the Duke Mathematical Journal and the author of the textbook Advanced Calculus (Prentice-Hall, 1947). He wrote also  The Laplace transform (in which he gave a first solution to Landau's problem on the Dirichlet eta function), An introduction to transform theory, and  The convolution transform (co-author with I. I. Hirschman).

References 

A Century of Mathematics in America by Peter L. Duren and Richard Askey, American Mathematical Society, 1988, .
A History of the Second Fifty Years, American Mathematical Society 1939-1988 By Everett Pitcher, American Mathematical Society, 1988, .

External links 

1898 births
1990 deaths
Harvard University alumni
Harvard University faculty
20th-century American mathematicians
People from Harrisburg, Pennsylvania
Mathematicians from Pennsylvania